Janta Ki Adalat is a 1994 Indian Hindi-language action film directed by T L V Prasad and produced by K. C. Bokadia, starring Mithun Chakraborty.

Plot
Shankar's lover (Madhoo) commits suicide when the head of the local administration tried to rape her. Accused of murdering Shankar(Mithun), who has long put a stick in the wheels of corrupt officials. Shankar goes to prison, from where he escapes to restore justice.

Cast
Mithun Chakraborty as Shankar
Gautami as Police inspector Jyoti For Teesra Kaun
Madhoo as Malathi Died Humshakal Geeta aur Suzie
Sadashiv Amrapurkar as Minister Manjit Khurana
Asrani as Bankhe
Laxmikant Berde as Tukia
Alok Nath as Police Commissioner
Shiva Rindani as Corrupt Police Inspector
Sulbha Arya as Aunty of Shankar
Nizhalgal Ravi

Songs

 "Tum Bhi Pagal" - Kumar Sanu, Kavita Krishnamurthy
 "Kesar Ban Jaongi" - Ila Arun, Sudesh Bhosle
 "Dil Mein Kya Hai" - Roop Singh Rathod, Alka Yagnik
 "Dil Mein Kuch Aur" - Kumar Sanu, Kavita Krishnamurthy
 "Koyal Bole" - Kavita Krishnamurthy
 "Dil Dhadakne Ka" - Kumar Sanu, Sadhana Sargam

References

External links

1994 films
1990s Hindi-language films
Mithun's Dream Factory films
Films shot in Ooty
Hindi remakes of Tamil films
Films scored by Bappi Lahiri
Films directed by T. L. V. Prasad
Indian action films